Sir Francis Henry May  (14 March 1860 – 6 February 1922) was a British colonial administrator who served as Governor of Fiji from 1911 to 1912 and Governor of Hong Kong from 1912 to 1918.

Early life and education
May was born in Dublin, Ireland on 14 March 1860. He was the 4th son of Rt. Hon. George Augustus Chichester May, Lord Chief Justice of Ireland, and his wife Olivia Barrington. May was educated at Harrow School and Trinity College, Dublin, where a few of his predecessors to the Governorship of Hong Kong attended school. May received the 1st Honourman and Prizeman Classics and Modern Languages and B.A. in 1881.

Career
In 1881, May was appointed to a Hong Kong Cadetship after a competitive examination. In 1886, he became the Assistant Protector of Chinese and private secretary to Governor Sir William Des Vœux. He was also the private secretary to Acting Administrator Digby Barker from 1889 to 1891.

May would hold the office of Assistant Colonial Secretary in 1891 and Acting Colonial Treasurer in 1892. He was made a member of the Legislative Council in 1895.

From 1893 to 1901, May was the Captain Superintendent of the Hong Kong Police Force, and Superintendent of Victoria Gaol and Fire Brigade between 1896 and 1902.

He was appointed to the position of Colonial Secretary for Hong Kong in April 1902, serving until 21 January 1911, and as such was appointed acting administrator of Hong Kong during transitions totalling almost a year between governors in 1903-1904 and 1907. In 1911, May was appointed Governor of Fiji and High Commissioner Western Pacific, a position he would hold until 1912.

Governor of Hong Kong
In 1912, May was appointed Governor of Hong Kong, a position he occupied in his own right until 1918. It was also his last post in the Colonial Service.

May was the only Governor of Hong Kong to be the target of an assassination attempt. He was fired upon near the General Post Office as he rode in a sedan chair after arriving from Fiji in July 1912. May was not injured; the bullet lodged in the sedan of his wife. The gunman, Li Hung-hung, had a grudge against May. Several years before, this former Police Superintendent had imprisoned Li's father, an undesirable mainland immigrant. May used a car for daily transport from then onwards.

On 22 January 1918, May personally negotiated with the remaining member of a gang holed up in the "Siege of Gresson Street", following a running gun battle through the streets of Wanchai in which five police officers were killed.

In 1919, due to deteriorating health condition, May was relieved of his duty as the Governor.

Personal
In 1891 May married Helena Barker, the daughter and heiress of Acting Administrator Major-General Digby Barker of Clare Priory in Suffolk. They had four daughters, Stella, Phoebe, Iris and Dionne. Stella married General Philip de Fonblanque. Iris (Olivia Helena) married Edward Hamilton Johnston the Sanskritist in the early 1920s.

He died at Clare Priory, Suffolk, England. He is buried at Clare, Suffolk.

Honours
K.St.J.
J.P. for Suffolk
C.M.G., 1895
G.C.M.G., 1919

Publications
Guide to Cantonese Colloquial
Yachting in Hong-Kong

Places named after him

May Road, a roadway in the Upper Mid-Levels area in Hong Kong Island, and May Hall of the University of Hong Kong were named after him. Also, the Helena May Foundation was named after his wife.

See also
British Hong Kong
Charles May, after which some "May" places are also named in Hong Kong, including May House.

References

External links

 
 

|-

High Commissioners for the Western Pacific
Governors of Fiji
Governors of Hong Kong
1860 births
1922 deaths
Chief Secretaries of Hong Kong
Alumni of Trinity College Dublin
People educated at Harrow School
Knights of the Order of St John
Knights Grand Cross of the Order of St Michael and St George
Politicians from Dublin (city)
20th-century British politicians